Mongolian Canadians are Canadian citizens who are descended from migrants from Mongolia. According to the 2021 Census by Statistics Canada, there were 9,090 Canadians who claimed full or partial Mongolian ancestry.

Canada Mongolia Chamber of Commerce, established by Mongolian Canadians, helps to connect business and people between the two countries.

See also 

Asian Canadians
East Asian Canadians

References 

Asian Canadian

Canada
East Asian Canadian